Ivan Vrabec (born 12 October 1962) is a Slovak football coach and a former player. He is the assistant manager of Abha Club, under Martin Ševela.

Honours

Individual
 Fortuna Liga Manager of the season 2014-15

External links
 Ivan Vrabec profile at Soccerway

References

1962 births
Living people
Czechoslovak footballers
FC Nitra players
Slovak footballers
Slovak expatriate footballers
Slovak football managers
FK Senica managers
Association football defenders